"New Girl" is the debut single by Ghanaian music duo Reggie 'n' Bollie. It was released on 13 May 2016.

Music video
A music video, shot in Ghana, was uploaded to Vevo on 20 May 2016, and received almost 100,000 views within 48 hours. It features scenes on the beach, the duo playing football with local children, and group dances. It was directed by African music video directors Prince Dovlo and Sesan Ogunro.

Charts

Certifications

Release history

References

2016 songs
2016 debut singles
Syco Music singles
Songs written by Pablo Bowman
Songs written by Ammar Malik
Songs written by Teddy Geiger
Songs written by Tom Barnes (songwriter)
Songs written by Ben Kohn
Songs written by Peter Kelleher (songwriter)
Songs written by Sarah Blanchard
Songs written by Cleo Tighe